South Sudanese refugees are persons originating from the African country of South Sudan, but seeking refuge outside the borders of their native country. The world's youngest independent country has a recent and troubled history of prolonged conflicts and ecosystem mismanagement such as overlogging, which has led to desertification. These forces have resulted not only in violence and famine, but also the forced migration of large numbers of the population, both inside and outside the country's borders. South Sudan was cited as the largest refugee crisis in 2016, being the world's third largest, followed by Syria and Afghanistan. , the UNHCR estimated that there were 2.4 million refugees under its mandate originating from South Sudan, making the country the fifth largest source of refugees.

Internally displaced South Sudanese
At least 2 million people in South Sudan became internally displaced persons as a result of the South Sudanese Civil War, which began in 2013.

Host countries

As of October 2017, an estimated 2,073,105 South Sudanese people were refugees in neighboring countries.

Sudan
According to Norwegian Refugees Council (NRC) in Sudan, about 5000 South Sudanese refugees are settled in semi-settlements around Khartoum; most of which lived in South Sudanese states neighbouring Sudan.

Ethiopia
About 272,000 refugees from South Sudan were living in the Gambela Region of Ethiopia, as of April 2016.
Most of them live in these refugee camps:
 Pugnido camp: ~62,801
 Tierkidi camp: ~54,750
 Kule camp: ~49,410
 Leitchuor camp: ~4,480

Blue Nile students at high schools in Bambasi, Tango, Sherkole, and Ashura refugee camps in Ethiopia report difficulties sitting for the Ethiopian National Examinations. As of 2014, around 5,500 refugees from South Sudan were living at Tirgol, Ethiopia.

Uganda
According to the UNHCR, the number of registered South Sudanese refugees in Uganda has crossed the one million threshold as of Fall 2017. As of January 2016, most were located at Adjumani, Arua, Kiryandongo and Kampala. Uganda opened four reception centres for South Sudanese refugees in 2014. They were located in Keri in Koboko district, Rhino in Arua, Dzaipi in Adjumani at the Uganda-South Sudan border near Nimule, and one at Entebbe Airport. The Dzaipi settlement became overcrowded, as it had 25,000 people, and was only designed to hold 3,000 people.  In February 2016, The UN Children's fund reported that "The transit centres are at their limits. Nyumanzi Transit Center can accommodate 3,000 persons but can be stretched to 5,000 individuals in a worst case scenario while Maaji Settlement (Adjumani) can take another 10,000 refugees." Refugees at the Kiryandongo settlement camp have taken up agriculture. The Bidi Bidi Refugee Settlement in Northwestern Uganda became the largest refugee camp in the world in early 2017, with over 270,000 refugees. Baratuku, established in 1991, has hosted successive waves of South Sudanese refugees since the Second Sudanese War. It continues to operate with, as of 2018, significant challenges in supplies and infrastructure.

Kenya
In Kenya, 44,000 South Sudanese refugees arrived between late 2013–2015. As a result, Kenya's Kakuma refugee camp expanded by almost half.

Hosting refugees
There are 272,261 registered refugees in South Sudan in 2016: 251,216 are from Sudan, 14,767 are from the DRC, 4,400 from Ethiopia and 1,878 are from the CAR.

See also 
 Refugees of Sudan
 South Sudanese Civil War
 South Sudanese diaspora

References 

 
Refugees in Africa
South Sudanese refugees